Le Race is a road bicycle racing event held annually in Canterbury, New Zealand since 1999.

History
Le Race was first held in 1999. In the 2001 event, competitor Vanessa Caldwell died on the Summit Road in the Port Hills when she collided head-on with a car. Race organiser Astrid Anderson was charged with criminal nuisance and convicted in 2003, with a NZ$10,000 fine imposed. The conviction had a major impact on events held on New Zealand roads, with many events cancelled or postponed. The Court of Appeal overturned the conviction in September 2004, as the judge was found to have misdirected the jury. No new trial was ordered, but her conviction was quashed. Anderson's legal costs were NZ$60,000.

In 2001, Le Race was one of two events in New Zealand that had a traffic management plan, but this became compulsory following the 2001 fatality. Many club races consequently disappeared, with an underground cycling movement developing of holding unofficial races.

Anderson, the original owner of Le Race, sold the event to Simon Hollander in 2008. Hollander passed the event on to Sheree Stevens, whose first event as race director was in 2015.

Le Race traditionally started in Christchurch's Cathedral Square in March of each year. The 2011 Christchurch earthquake caused the postponement of Le Race and due to the Central City Red Zone, the 2011 event was held on 15 October and started from Elgin Street in Sydenham. After using Elgin Street as the start for four times, Le Race returned to Cathedral Square for the event held on 21 March 2015. In the 2016 event held on 20 March, a shorter option of just  that finished in Little River was also offered.
Kate McIlroy won the race in 2019 and vowed that it was her last race. The 2020 race was cancelled due to the COVID-19 pandemic. In 2021, McIlroy happened to be in Christchurch and signed up on the start line, winning the race in record time.

Multiple winners

Men's

Women's

Past winners

References

Cycle races in New Zealand
Recurring sporting events established in 1999
1999 establishments in New Zealand
Sport in Canterbury, New Zealand
Akaroa